The ASEAN Declaration or Bangkok Declaration is the founding document of the Association of Southeast Asian Nations (ASEAN). It was signed in Bangkok on 8 August 1967 by the five ASEAN founding members, Indonesia, Malaysia, Philippines, Singapore, and Thailand.

It states the basic principles of ASEAN: co-operation, amity, and non-interference. The date is now celebrated as ASEAN Day.

One theory suggest ASEAN was formed as a display of solidarity against communist expansion in Vietnam and communist insurgency within their own borders. However, there is nothing from ASEAN written that actually says this.

Surrounding issues

Communism
Prior to the declaration, the five Southeast Asian states struggled to contain communist influence.

At the time, the Filipino government struggled to give amnesty to former Hukbalahap militants, who staged an armed conflict in Luzon during the 1950s that almost led to the collapse of the central government.

Conflict between the Indonesian military and the increasing Indonesian Communist Party apparently come to an end in late 1965 with the transition to the dictatorship of Suharto's "New Order" after the horror of Indonesian mass killings of 1965–66 being implemented.

Communism also led to the idea of merging the Federation of Malaya, Sarawak, Singapore, and North Borneo into one entity, which had the intention of eliminating the possibility of Singapore falling into communism. Singapore was expelled from the Federation in 1965 over racial tensions and how the federation should be governed, but remained a capitalist democratic society with close ties with its new neighbors.

Tensions between neighbours
A related matter was the formation of Malaysia. In 1961, Malayan Prime Minister Tunku Abdul Rahman announced a proposal to create a new federation called Malaysia. This was opposed by Indonesia and the Philippines because Indonesia believed the new formation was a form of neo-colonialism while the Philippines claimed eastern North Borneo (Sabah) as part of its territory.

To defuse tension, a non-political confederation called Maphilindo was formed. This, however, was not successful due to the perception that Maphilindo was formed to delay or prevent the formation of Malaysia.

Despite opposition, Malaysia was formed in 1963. This led to the Indonesia–Malaysia confrontation. The Philippines withdrew diplomatic ties, causing relations to remain sour until the formation of ASEAN.

It is believed by scholars that the formation of ASEAN has prevented hostilities between Southeast Asian states.

See also 
 ASEAN Charter
 Domino Theory

References

ASEAN laws
Political charters
Treaties concluded in 1967
Treaties of Indonesia
Treaties of Singapore
Treaties of Malaysia
Treaties of the Philippines
Treaties of Thailand

1967 documents
August 1967 events in Asia